Playa Santa Cruz is a beach on the Caribbean island of Curaçao, located to the south of the village of Lagun. It is a wide, sandy beach. There are beach cabins and a snack bar that opens irregularly during weekends.

References
Curaçao Beaches, Tourism Curaçao

Beaches of Curaçao